
Year 249 BC was a year of the pre-Julian Roman calendar. At the time it was known as the Year of the Consulship of Pulcher and Pullus (or, less frequently, year 505 Ab urbe condita). The denomination 249 BC for this year has been used since the early medieval period, when the Anno Domini calendar era became the prevalent method in Europe for naming years.

Events

By place

Roman Republic 
 The Battle of Drepana involves the Romans, under the command of the Roman consuls, Publius Claudius Pulcher and Lucius Junius Pullus, attacking the Carthaginian fleet, under the command of Adherbal, in the harbour of Drepanum (modern Trapani, Sicily). The Romans are badly defeated and lose 93 of their 123 vessels.
 Following the disastrous defeat of Roman forces at the Battle of Drepana, Publius Claudius Pulcher is fined 120,000 asses and his colleague, Lucius Junius Pullus, commits suicide. Aulus Atilius Calatinus is then elected dictator and leads an army into Sicily, becoming the first dictator to lead a Roman army outside Italy. The Roman forces at Lilybaeum are relieved, and Eryx, near Drapana, is seized. Its idol of Astarte is transported to Rome, where it becomes the Erycine Venus.

China 
 The last remnants of the Zhou dynasty, having rebelled against the State of Qin, are defeated by Prime Minister Lü Buwei.
 The Qin general Meng Ao seizes the Taiyuan region from the State of Zhao.
 King Kaolie of Chu annexes the State of Lu.

Deaths 
 King Hui of Zhou, last Zhou claimant to the throne of China, is executed.

References 

Works cited